Long Bay is located on the southeast coast of Barbados, between Crane Bay and Cave Bay.

Bays of Barbados